Robert Sprot (1873-1947) was a Scottish international lawn bowls player who competed in the 1934 British Empire Games.

Bowls career
At the 1934 British Empire Games he won the gold medal in the singles event.

He was capped 33 times and was the Scottish singles champion in 1910, 1920 and 1929 becoming the first player to win the title on three occasions. His uncle George Sprot also won the Scottish National Bowls Championships in 1894 and 1896 (the former being the inaugural singles championship).

His three singles titles still constitute a record held equally with David Dall, Joseph Black and Darren Burnett.

References

1873 births
1947 deaths
Scottish male bowls players
Bowls players at the 1934 British Empire Games
Commonwealth Games gold medallists for Scotland
Commonwealth Games medallists in lawn bowls
Medallists at the 1934 British Empire Games